The 2018 Munster Senior Hurling Championship Final was played on 1 July 2018 at Semple Stadium, Thurles. The winner would advance to the semi-finals of the All-Ireland Senior Hurling Championship, with the loser entering the All Ireland quarter-finals.

Clare and Cork contest the final for the second year in a row with Cork retaining the title.	
	
Séamus Harnedy was the Cork captain and also was named as the man of the match.

Build-up
Tickets for the final went on sale on 21 June and ranged in price from €35 to €40 in the stand and €25 to €30 in the terrace.	

The match was shown live on RTÉ One as part of The Sunday Game Live with commentary from Marty Morrissey and Brendan Cummins.

Clare were looking for their first Munster title since 1998, while Cork were the defending champions. Cork manager John Meyler was in his first year as manager, with Clare's joint managers Donal Moloney and Gerry O'Connor in their second year in charge.

Details

References

Munster Final
Munster Senior Hurling Championship Finals
Clare county hurling team matches
Cork county hurling team matches
Munster Senior Hurling